The Lake is a 1998 made-for-TV, science fiction thriller movie starring Yasmine Bleeth.

Plot
Jackie Ivers (Bleeth) is a Los Angeles nurse who returns home to the small town of San Vicente to find that her friends and family have taken on bizarrely different personalities. Jackie notices that everyone who goes into the town's lake come out different.

As the movie progresses, Jackie first-handedly witnesses what is happening to everyone around her as she is kidnapped by people from a parallel world. The other world is a duplicate of Earth but is now polluted and its ozone layer gone. In order to survive, the duplicates intend to take over Earth. The entrances to the duplicate Earth are called the vortex, which are located in major bodies of water, ponds, and lakes.

Cast

 Yasmine Bleeth as Jackie Ivers
 Linden Ashby as Dr. Jeff Chapman
 Haley Joel Osment as Dylan Hydecker
 Susanna Thompson as Denise Hydecker
 Stanley Anderson as Steve Ivers
 Caroline Lagerfelt as Mayor Louise Terry
Monique Edwards as Young Nurse
 Robert Prosky as Herb 
 Marion Ross as Maggie

External links

1998 films
1998 horror films
1998 television films
1990s science fiction horror films
American science fiction horror films
Films scored by Don Davis (composer)
Films set in California
NBC network original films
Films about parallel universes
1990s American films